Sparkle Computer Co., Ltd. (stylised as SPARKLE), is a Taiwanese electronics firm established in 1982, based in Taipei. The company currently specialises in manufacturing video cards using Nvidia graphics processing units, along with peripherals (fans and heatsinks) for graphics controllers.

Sparkle is one of the few manufacturers of modern discrete video cards that still use the PCI bus, producing PCI versions of GeForce 8 Series and GeForce 9 Series based discrete graphics controllers, and more recently, GeForce 200 series and GeForce 600 series-based GPUs using the aforementioned interface.

Products

PCI Series

GeForce 7900 PCI 
SP-PX79GDH (GeForce 7900 GT Series with active cooling - 256MB RAM)

GeForce 8400 PCI 
SPARKLE introduced a unique PCI version of the GeForce 8400 series cards in PCI versions.
 SF-PC84GS512U2LP (GeForce 8400 GS Series with active cooling - 512MB RAM)
 SF-PC84GS512U2LP (GeForce 8400 GS Series with passive cooling - 512MB RAM)
 SF-PC84GS256U2LP (GeForce 8400 GS Series with active cooling - 256MB RAM)
 SF-PC84GS256U2LP (GeForce 8400 GS Series with passive cooling - 256MB RAM)

GeForce 8500 PCI 
SPARKLE introduced a unique PCI version of the GeForce 8500 series card in a PCI version.
 SF-PC85GT256U2 (GeForce 8500 GT Series with passive cooling - 256MB RAM)

GeForce 9400 PCI 
SPARKLE introduced a unique PCI version of the GeForce 9400 series card in a PCI version.
 SP94GT512D2L-HPP (GeForce 9400 GT Series with passive cooling - 512MB RAM)
 SP94GT512D2L-HP (GeForce 9400 GT Series with active cooling - 512MB RAM)
 SP94GT1024D2L-HPP (GeForce 9400 GT Series with passive cooling - 1024MB RAM)
 SP94GT1024D2L-HP (GeForce 9400 GT Series with active cooling - 1024MB RAM)

GeForce 9500 PCI 
SPARKLE introduced a unique PCI version of the GeForce 9500 series card in a PCI version.
 SP95GT512D2L-HP (GeForce 9500 GT Series with active cooling - 512MB RAM)
 SP95GT1024D2L-HP (GeForce 9500 GT Series with active cooling - 1024MB RAM)

Low Profile PCIe
SPARKLE has also introduced 3 low profile PCI Express cards from the GeForce 9 series:

 SF-PX93GS512U2LP-HP (Low profile GeForce 9300GS with 512MB DDR2 RAM)
Low profile GeForce 9600 with stock settings
 Low profile GeForce 9800 GT with stock settings and 512MB of GDDR3 RAM on a 256bit bus.

See also
 List of companies of Taiwan

References

External links

 

Graphics hardware companies
Computer hardware companies
Companies established in 1982
Privately held companies
Companies based in Taipei
Electronics companies of Taiwan
Taiwanese brands
1982 establishments in Taiwan